Gudar (also Romanized as Gūdar, Gowdar, and Gūder) is a village in Rayen Rural District, Rayen District, Kerman County, Kerman Province, Iran. At the 2006 census, its population was 164, in 33 families.

References

See also 

Gudar people

Populated places in Kerman County